Thomas Lawley (died 1559), of Much Wenlock, Shropshire, was an English Member of Parliament and merchant.

He was a Member (MP) of the Parliament of England for Much Wenlock in 1547 and March 1553.

References

Year of birth missing
1559 deaths
16th-century English people
People from Much Wenlock
People of the Tudor period
Members of the Parliament of England (pre-1707)